Jacques Pucheran erects  the genus Aramides in Revue et Magasin de Zoologie
Death of Christoph Feldegg
Death of Philipp Jakob Cretzschmar
John Cassin describes the lesser yellow-headed vulture in Proceedings of the Academy of Natural Sciences of Philadelphia 
George Robert Gray describes the Fuegian snipe in The Zoology of the Voyage of HMS Erebus and HMS Terror
Foundation of Latvian Museum of Natural History
August Carl Eduard Baldamus invites 32 ornithologists to form an ornithological section of Gesellschaft  Deutscher  Naturforscher und Artze. (Society of German Nature Researchers and Doctors). One result is the publication of the bird journal Rhea by Ludwig Thienemann
Florent Prévost with C. L. Lemaire publishes Histoire Naturelle des Oiseaux d'Europe 
Nérée Boubée establishes "Maison Boubée" in Paris. It is a natural history dealership and publishing house.

Ongoing events
Fauna Japonica

Birding and ornithology by year
1845 in science